Catfish Creek Baptist Church is a historic Southern Baptist church located near Latta, Dillon County, South Carolina.  It was built in 1883, and is a pine structure measuring 60 feet long and 40 feet wide. The front façade features brick steps and brick pedimented portico with four supporting columns added in 1970.  It is the oldest church congregation in Dillon County, dating to 1802.

It was added to the National Register of Historic Places in 1975.

References

Baptist churches in South Carolina
Churches on the National Register of Historic Places in South Carolina
Churches completed in 1883
19th-century Baptist churches in the United States
Buildings and structures in Dillon County, South Carolina
National Register of Historic Places in Dillon County, South Carolina
Southern Baptist Convention churches